Solution 16 was a personal computer the first Brazilian all-in-one PC, introduced by Prológica in 1986.

General information

Based on the Intel 8080 was launched in the national market as the first 16-bit 4.77MHz microprocessor integrated computer in the market, it had 254 KB RAM configuration expandable up to 512 KB, and two 5-1/4" floppy disk drives with capacity for up to 320 KiB of storage.

SO 16 operating system 

The Solution 16 came with an operating system named SO16 (portuguese for "Sistema Operativo 16" meaning "Operating System 16"). This was a translated copy of MS-DOS 2.11, which was the first to support hard disks, directories, and character tables for international languages. Microsoft filed a lawsuit in Brazil, accusing the manufacturer of piracy, and later forced the company to pass on a percentage of the profits made with the software, which ended up putting the company in financial difficulties.

Data Storage 

Two floppy disk drives, double density, double-sided, 360 kB. Audio cables were supplied with the computer for connection with a regular tape recorder.

References 

Prológica computers 
Computer-related introductions in 1986
Goods manufactured in Brazil
Personal computers
Products introduced in 1986